If There's Any Justice is the sixth studio album by American country music singer Lee Greenwood. The album was released on June 15, 1987, by MCA Records.

Track listing

Personnel
Larry Byrom - electric guitar
Glen Campbell - background vocals 
Laddie Cane - background vocals
Lee Greenwood - lead vocals, background vocals, saxophone
David Hungate - bass guitar
John Barlow Jarvis - piano, DX-7
Mary Ann Kennedy - background vocals
Mike Lawler - synthesizer
Rick Marotta - drums
Pam Rose - background vocals
Tony Smith - background vocals
Billy Joe Walker Jr. - acoustic guitar, electric guitar
Reggie Young - electric guitar

Charts

References

1987 albums
Lee Greenwood albums
MCA Records albums
Albums produced by Jimmy Bowen